Ross or ROSS may refer to:

People
 Ross (name), including a list of people with the surname or given name Ross, as well as the meaning
 Clan Ross, a Highland Scottish clan
 Earl of Ross, a peerage of Scotland

Places

Antarctica
 Ross Sea
 Ross Ice Shelf
 Ross Dependency

Ireland
"Ross", a common nickname for County Roscommon
 Ross, County Mayo, a townland in Killursa civil parish, barony of Clare, County Mayo, bordering Moyne Townland
 Ross, County Westmeath, a townland in Noughaval civil parish, barony of Kilkenny West, County Westmeath
 Ross, County Wexford
 Diocese of Ross (Ireland), in West Cork
 Roman Catholic Diocese of Cork and Ross
 Diocese of Cork, Cloyne and Ross
 School of Ross, a monastic institution in County Cork

United Kingdom
 Ross, Northumberland, England, a village
 Ross, Scottish Borders, a hamlet
 Ross-on-Wye, England
 Ross, Scotland, a region of Scotland and former earldom
 County of Ross, Scotland, also known as Ross-shire

United States
 Ross, Arkansas
 Ross, California 
 Ross, Indiana
 Ross, Iowa
 Ross, Minnesota
 Ross, North Dakota
 Ross, Ohio
 Ross County, Ohio
 Ross, Texas
 Ross City, Texas
 Ross, Wisconsin (disambiguation)
 Ross Township (disambiguation)

Elsewhere
 Ross, Tasmania, Australia
 Ross Casino, in Pichilemu, Chile; now the Agustín Ross Cultural Centre
 Ross, New Zealand
 RoSS, the Republic of South Sudan

Space
 Ross (lunar crater)
 Ross (Martian crater)
 Ross 248, a star
 Russian Orbital Service Station, a proposed space station

Groups, organizations, companies

Business
 Ross (optics), a London, England-based lens company
 Ross Group, a British fish and frozen food company
 Ross Laboratories, a former subsidiary of the American Abbott Laboratories pharmaceutical company now known as Abbott Nutrition
 Ross Stores, an American department store chain
 Ross Technology, an American semiconductor company
 Ross Video, a Canadian company that produces video production equipment

Academics
 Ross School of Business, part of the University of Michigan
 Ross University School of Medicine, an international medical school in Dominica
 Ross University School of Veterinary Medicine, an international medical school in St. Kitts

Arts and entertainment
 Ross (play), a 1960 play by Terence Rattigan
 Ross (1978 album), by Diana Ross
 Ross (1983 album), by Diana Ross
 Ross (Low Roar album)

Transportation

Ships
 , the name of several U.S. Navy ships
 , a Royal Navy ship
 , a radio ship

Land transport
 Ross (bicycles)
 Ross (gasoline automobile), produced 1915-1918 
 Ross (steam automobile), produced 1906-1909

Other uses
 Ross Mathematics Program, a summer program at Ohio State University
 Ross procedure, a cardiac surgery operation
 Ross rifle
 Ross seal, a species of Antarctican seal
 Resource Ordering Status System, a database for fighting wildfires
 Retuinskih's System ROSS, a martial system

See also

 
 Ross Bridge (disambiguation)
 Ross Island (disambiguation)
 Ross River (disambiguation)
 Diocese of Ross (disambiguation)
 Fort Ross (disambiguation)
 Justice Ross (disambiguation)
 Rossland (disambiguation)
 Rosse (disambiguation)
 Rossi (disambiguation)
 Ros (disambiguation)